Ivondro  (former name: Lavaraty) is a town and commune in Madagascar. It belongs to the district of Midongy-Atsimo, which is a part of Atsimo-Atsinanana Region. There are 2054 inscribed voters in this commune.

To this commune belong also the villages of:
Ampasy
Analaiva, Ivondro
Ankarindro
Benonoka
Lavaraty
Mahazoarivo
Makojano
Sahatsoro

References and notes 

Populated places in Atsimo-Atsinanana